The 2013 Senior Open Championship was a senior major golf championship and the 27th Senior Open Championship, held on 25–28 July at Royal Birkdale Golf Club in Southport, England, United Kingdom. It was the 11th Senior Open Championship played as a senior major championship.

Mark Wiebe won after a play-off over Bernhard Langer In the first Monday finish in Senior Open Championship history. It was Wiebe's first senior major championship victory.

Venue 

The event was the first Senior Open Championship played at Royal Birkdale Golf Club. The Open Championship had previously been held there nine times, first time in 1954.

Course layout

Field
The field consisted of 144 competitors;  professionals and amateurs.

An 18-hole stroke play qualifying round was held on Monday, 22 July, for players who were not already exempt. The leading players from the qualifying competition joined the exempt players for the championship.

74 players made the 36-hole cut, 73 professionals and one amateur, Chip Lutz, who finished leading amateur at tied 48th.

Past champions in the field
Six past Senior Open champions participated. Five of them made the 36-hole cut; 2010 champion Bernhard Langer (2nd), 2011 champion Russ Cochran (tied 14st), 2012 champion Fred Couples (tied 21st), 2003, 2005 and 2007 champion Tom Watson (tied 36th) and Bruce Vaughan (tied 55th). 2002 champion Noboru Sugai did not make the cut.

Past winners of The Open Championship in the field
The field included five former winners of The Open Championship. They all made the cut; 1985 Open champion Sandy Lyle  (tied 7th), 1996 Open champion Tom Lehman (tied 26th), 1998 Open champion Mark O'Meara (tied 26th), 1975, 1977, 1980, 1982 and 1983 Open champion Tom Watson (tied 36h) and 1989 Open champion Mark Calcavecchia (tied 65th).

Final round and playoff summaries

Final round
Sunday, 28 July 2013

Bernhard Langer needed a bogey on the 18th hole to win by one shot, but after leaving his approach shot in the green side bunker, he took four shots to get in the hole for a double bogey 6. Defending champion Fred Couples tied for 21st.

Playoff
Sunday, 28 July and Monday 29 July 2013

Mark Wiebe and Bernhard Langer began a sudden death playoff on Sunday evening, playing the 18th hole all over again until one of them had a lower score on the hole. After playing the hole twice, play was suspended at 9.41 pm due to darkness and continued at 8 am the next day. Wiebe won with par on the fifth playoff hole as Langer made bogey.

References

External links 

 Results on European Tour website

Senior major golf championships
Golf tournaments in England
Senior Open Championship
Senior Open Championship
Senior Open Championship